Harrington is a city in Lincoln County, Washington, United States. The population was 424 at the 2010 census. It was named after W.P. Harrington, a banker from Colusa, California, who had heavily invested in local land.

History
Harrington was first settled in 1879 by Adam Edward Ludy and Jacob Ludy."  Harrington was officially incorporated on April 17, 1902.

Geography
Harrington is located at  (47.480251, -118.255422).

Climate
According to the Köppen Climate Classification system, Harrington has a dry-summer Humid continental climate, abbreviated "Dsb" on climate maps.

Demographics

2010 census
As of the census of 2010, there were 424 people, 184 households, and 119 families residing in the city. The racial makeup of the city was 92.7% White, 0.9% African American, 3.5% Native American, 0.7% from other races, and 2.1% from two or more races. Hispanic or Latino of any race were 2.8% of the population.

There were 184 households, of which 25.0% had children under the age of 18 living with them, 52.2% were married couples living together, 9.2% had a female householder with no husband present, 3.3% had a male householder with no wife present, and 35.3% were non-families. 32.6% of all households were made up of individuals, and 15.2% had someone living alone who was 65 years of age or older. The average household size was 2.30 and the average family size was 2.87.

The median age in the city was 46.1 years. 22.4% of residents were under the age of 18; 5.9% were between the ages of 18 and 24; 18.9% were from 25 to 44; 29.2% were from 45 to 64; and 23.6% were 65 years of age or older. The gender makeup of the city was 47.4% male and 52.6% female.

2000 census
As of the census of 2000, there were 426 people, 187 households, and 115 families residing in the city. The population density was 1,122.2 people per square mile (432.8/km2). There were 235 housing units at an average density of 619.1 per square mile (238.8/km2). The racial makeup of the city was 97.18% White, 1.41% Native American, 0.23% Asian, and 1.17% from two or more races. Hispanic or Latino of any race were 0.94% of the population

There were 187 households, out of which 27.3% had children under the age of 18 living with them, 51.9% were married couples living together, 7.0% had a female householder with no husband present, and 38.0% were non-families. 36.4% of all households were made up of individuals, and 15.0% had someone living alone who was 65 years of age or older. The average household size was 2.25 and the average family size was 2.92

In the city, the population was spread out, with 25.6% under the age of 18, 4.2% from 18 to 24, 22.3% from 25 to 44, 25.1% from 45 to 64, and 22.8% who were 65 years of age or older. The median age was 43 years. For every 100 females, there were 100.0 males. For every 100 females age 18 and over, there were 98.1 males

The median income for a household in the city was $29,792, and the median income for a family was $45,000. Males had a median income of $30,625 versus $16,563 for females. The per capita income for the city was $17,744. About 3.8% of families and 12.0% of the population were below the poverty line, including 7.7% of those under age 18 and 7.7% of those age 65 or over

Notable people
 Darol Froman, physicist
 George Frederick McKay, classical music composer, was born in Harrington in 1899.
 Robert D. Timm, Washington state legislator

See also
 Harrington Bank Block & Opera House

References

External links
 
 Harrington Public Library

Cities in Washington (state)
Cities in Lincoln County, Washington
Populated places established in the 1870s
Populated places established in 1879
1879 establishments in Washington Territory
1870s establishments in Washington Territory